The 1996 United States Senate election in New Mexico was held on November 5, 1996. Incumbent Republican U.S. Senator Pete Domenici won re-election to a fifth term.

Democratic primary

Candidates
 Eric Treisman, attorney
 Art Trujillo, Chairman of the Bernalillo County Democratic Party

Results

Republican primary

Candidates
 Pete Domenici, incumbent U.S. Senator

Results

General election

Candidates
 Pete Domenici (R), incumbent U.S. Senator
 Art Trujillo (D), Chairman of the Bernalillo County Democratic Party

Results

See also 
 1996 United States Senate elections

References 

New Mexico
1996
1996 New Mexico elections